John Lyons   (19 May 1926 – 22 May 2016) was a British trade union leader.

Born in Hendon, Lyons was educated at St Paul's School, London.  He served in the Royal Navy from 1944 until 1946, then attended Emmanuel College, Cambridge, where he studied economics.  Following a year doing market research for the Vacuum Oil Company, he briefly worked in the research department of the British Army.

In 1952, Lyons worked for the Post Office Engineering Union, then in 1957 was appointed as assistant general secretary of the Institution of Professional Civil Servants.  In 1973, he moved to the Electrical Power Engineers' Association (EPEA), where he was appointed as general secretary.  Lyons was involved in arranging a series of mergers which formed the Engineers' and Managers' Association, serving as its general secretary, while remaining secretary of its EPEA section.

Lyons joined the Communist Party of Great Britain (CPGB) in 1948, but he left following the Soviet invasion of Hungary in 1956.  He subsequently became identified with the right-wing of the trade union movement.  In particular, he was vocally opposed to the UK miners' strike, and was supportive of the Union of Democratic Mineworkers split.

Lyons also served on the General Council of the Trades Union Congress.  He was made a Commander of the Order of the British Empire in 1986, and retired from his trade union posts in 1991.  From 1996 until 1998, he served as president of the Single Market Observatory.

References

1926 births
2016 deaths
Alumni of Emmanuel College, Cambridge
Royal Navy personnel of World War II
Commanders of the Order of the British Empire
Communist Party of Great Britain members
British trade union leaders
Members of the General Council of the Trades Union Congress
People educated at St Paul's School, London
People from Hendon